Triton High School may refer to:

Triton Junior–Senior High School, Bourbon, Indiana
Triton Regional High School (Massachusetts), Byfield, Massachusetts
Triton Senior High School, Dodge Center, Minnesota
Triton Regional High School (New Jersey), Runnemede, New Jersey
Triton High School (North Carolina), Erwin, North Carolina